Acei or variation, may refer to:

 ACE inhibitor (ACEI) Angiotensin-converting-enzyme inhibitors 
 Pseudotropheus sp. "acei" (fish), the acei, a cichlid
 Association for Childhood Education International
 Canadian Internet Registration Authority (ACEI), a bilingual authority in bilingual Canada
 Automobile Central Enterprise, Inc., a subsidiary of Philippine company AC Industrials

See also

 
 
 CEI (disambiguation)
 Ace1 (disambiguation)
 Acel (disambiguation)